Ferdinand "Nandl" Wenauer (born 26 April 1939; died 27 July 1992 of heart failure) was a German football player. He spent six seasons in the Bundesliga with 1. FC Nürnberg. He also represented Germany in four friendlies.

Honours

1. FC Nürnberg
 Bundesliga: 1960–61, 1967–68
 DFB-Pokal: 1961–62

External links
 

1939 births
1992 deaths
German footballers
Germany international footballers
1. FC Nürnberg players
Bundesliga players
Association football defenders